The Lozen Monastery of St. Spas in the village of Lozen is a Bulgarian monastery built during the Second Bulgarian Empire. It is the easternmost monastery from the spectacular 13th-century monastery complex Mala Sveta Gora. The monastery is called “Sveti Spas” (Holy Saviour) after the day of The Ascension of Jesus (Spasovden) (there is no saint with the name of Spas).

Location
The monastery is located at 5 km south-east from the former village of Dolni Lozen (today the eastern part of Lozen), near Sofia, deep in the bowers of the Lozen Mountain under the Polovrak peak (1182 m), on a natural terrace with views of the Sofia Valley.

History

Origins
The monastery was founded in the 13th century. At the end of the 14th century, when Urvich, Sredets the whole region of Sofia fell under Ottoman rule, the monastery was destroyed. In the 15th and 16th centuries it was abandoned definitively but was restored in the 17th century. Written records, the oldest one from 1671, testify that there was a school in the monastery with a teacher Yakim from Sofia and students from Sofia and the surrounding villages. In 1671-1694 there was a literary and calligraphic school. In 1737 the monastery became a centre of the Uprising of the bishops of Sofia and Samokov. It was quelled in late July and early August 1737. By an order of Ali Pasha Kyupryulyuoglu, some 350 Sofia citizens, priests, monks and people from the surrounding villages were killed, including bishop St. Simeon of Samokov. After the participation of monks in the Uprising, the Monastery of Sveti Spas was destroyed again by the Turks.

Revival

In 1821 the monastery was restored again on the old foundations. The one-apse, one-nave Church of Holy Ascension was constructed, with dimensions of 7 by 14 meters.

Three large domes of the old cylindrical building, built by the master Tsvyatko Todorov from the village of Zhablyano, near the town of Radomir, are still intact today. They were quite unusual for the Bulgarian architecture from that period.

From another inscription below, we learn that in 1869 the Samokov painter Nikola Ivanov Obrazopisov with his assistants Hristaki Zahariev Zografsky and Dimitar Hristov Dupnichanin repainted the church and three domes. The frescoes, which are preserved today in relatively good condition, attract pilgrims and visitors with their rich colours and craftsmanship.

Another interesting fact connected with mural paintings is that in no other temple in Sofia there were depicted so many Bulgarian saints and historical figures. Along with biblical scenes, Nikola Obrazopisov painted images of Saints Cyril and Methodius, Michael Voin, Bishop Marko, John of Rila, Euthymius of Tarnovo, Onufari of Gabrovo, Constantine of Sofia and the revered by the Bulgarians St. Petka and St. Nedelya. Also interesting are the realistic donor portraits of abbot Kiryak from 1868 and the icon of St. Jovan Vladimir, a Serbian prince married to Kosara, a relative of the Bulgarian emperor Samuel (r. 997–1014).

According to the legends of the local people, the St. Spas Monastery has been a centre of the national liberation movement. Vasil Levski stayed there. After the Liberation in 1878 a school with several large rooms and a separate room for the teacher was constructed next to the monastery. Until 1900 the monastery was male and then was converted into a female abode.

Condition of the monastery today
Today Lozen monastery houses only two nuns, the novice Christina and the abbess mother Agatha. In recent years, one of the residential wings, the monk cells and the two-storey guest house were restored. One of the pre-existing chapels is being currently reconstructed. On the recently restored church old altar, there can be seen original icons from the period 1850–1890. The frescoes located in the three domes are also restored. The entire outer western façade was covered with frescoes, which unfortunately now are almost completely wiped out.

The monastery is located in a dense oak forest. In the vicinity there are several springs with cold mountain water. This, and the fact that it is accessible from Dolni Lozen (10 km from Sofia) for about an hour on foot and for 15 minutes by car, make it a preferred place for picnics.

Bulgarian Orthodox monasteries
Christian monasteries in Bulgaria
Medieval Bulgarian Orthodox church buildings
Christian monasteries established in the 13th century
Buildings and structures in Sofia Province
Tourist attractions in Sofia Province